Wolfgang Kummer (August 24, 1914 – October 19, 1988) was a German bobsledder who competed in the mid-1930s. At the 1936 Winter Olympics in Garmisch-Partenkirchen, he was listed in the four-man event, but did not compete.

References
1936 bobsleigh four-man results
1936 Olympic Winter Games official report. - p. 416.
Wolfgang Kummer's profile at Sports Reference.com

1914 births
1988 deaths
Olympic bobsledders of Germany
Bobsledders at the 1936 Winter Olympics
German male bobsledders